Sheikh Abdullah  is a Pakistani politician who had been a Member of the Provincial Assembly of Sindh, from May 2013 to May 2018.

Early life and education
He was born on 10 July 1965 in Karachi.

He has a degree of Bachelor of Arts from Karachi University.

Political career

He was elected to the Provincial Assembly of Sindh as a candidate of Mutahida Quami Movement from Constituency PS-97 KARACHI-IX in 2013 Pakistani general election. In March 2017, he quit MQM to join Pak Sarzameen Party.

References

Living people
Sindh MPAs 2013–2018
1965 births
Muttahida Qaumi Movement politicians